Dmitry Timofeyevich Yazov (8 November 1924 – 25 February 2020) was a Marshal of the Soviet Union. A veteran of the Great Patriotic War, Yazov served as Minister of Defence from 1987 until he was arrested for his part in the 1991 August Coup, four months before the fall of the Soviet Union.
Yazov was the last person to be appointed to the rank of Marshal of the Soviet Union on 28 April 1990, the only Marshal born in Siberia, and at the time of his death on 25 February 2020, he was the last living Marshal of the Soviet Union.

Biography

Early life
He was born in the village of Yazovo, Krestinsky volost, Kalachinsky district, Omsk province. He was the son of Timofey Yakovlevich Yazov (died in 1933) and Maria Fedoseevna Yazova, who were both peasants. The family had four children.

World War II
Yazov joined the Red Army voluntarily in November 1941, a seventeen-year-old young man, not having time to finish high school. When he joined the army, he said he was a year older than he was, saying that he was born in 1923. He was enrolled in training at the Moscow Higher Military Command School (Evacuated due to the Battle of Moscow to Novosibirsk from 2 November 1941 to 28 January 1942) and graduated from it in June 1942. He received a school graduation certificate only in 1953, already being a major.

From August 1942 he fought on the Volkhov and Leningrad fronts as commander of a rifle platoon, a commander of a rifle company, and a platoon commander of front-line courses of junior lieutenants of the 483rd Rifle Regiment of the 177th Rifle Division of the Leningrad Front. He participated in the battles of the Siege of Leningrad, in the offensive operations of Soviet troops in the Baltic states, and in the blockade of the Courland Pocket. In 1944 he joined the Communist Party of the Soviet Union.

Post–war military career
In 1962, Yazov commanded Soviet ground forces in Oriente Province, Cuba, during the Cuban Missile Crisis, where he personally worked with Cuban Defence Minister Raúl Castro. The unit, which was headquartered at Holguín Air Base, was ordered to attack Guantanamo Bay Naval Base with KS-1 Komet nuclear cruise missiles if war with the United States started. 

In 1971–1973, he commanded the 32nd Army Corps in the Crimean region of the Odessa Military District. In 1979–1980, Yazov was commander of the Central Group of Forces in Czechoslovakia. He was commanding the Far East Military District in the northern summer of 1986, when, according to Time magazine, he made a favourable impression on General Secretary Mikhail Gorbachev, which led to later promotions. He was appointed Soviet Defence Minister on 30 May 1987, after Marshal Sergei Sokolov was sacked as a result of the Mathias Rust incident two days earlier. From June 1987 to July 1990, Yazov was a candidate member of the Politburo. He was a key part of Black January. Yazov was responsible for deployment of Russian OMON commando units to Latvia and Lithuania in early 1991. During the August Coup of 1991, Yazov was a member of the State Emergency Committee. For supporting the GKChP, the government of Valentin Pavlov was dismissed and, accordingly, Yazov lost the post of Minister of Defence. During the Yeltsin period, Yazov was prosecuted and acquitted in 1994.

On the morning of 22 August, before the first interrogation, Yazov turned to Gorbachev with a video recorded message in which he read a letter and called himself an "old fool", regretted participating in this "adventure" and asked for forgiveness from the President of the USSR. 20 years after these events, the former defence minister said that he did not remember what he said, because he did not sleep for a day. And he named the journalist Vladimir Molchanov the initiator of this letter and video.  In his memoirs, Yazov clarified that he was persuaded to turn to Gorbachev with a penitential speech to protect him from the criminal article "Treason to the Motherland", and under the influence of fatigue he succumbed to the persuasion of television reporters.

Yazov was released on recognisance not to leave in January 1993. He was amnestied by the State Duma in 1994, accepting the amnesty offered by Boris Yeltsin and stating that he was not guilty. He was dismissed from the military service by Presidential Order and awarded a ceremonial weapon. He was awarded an order of Honour by the President of Russian Federation. Yazov later worked as a military adviser at the General Staff Academy. 

Despite his selection by Gorbachev for the Defence Minister's position, William Odom, in his book The Collapse of the Soviet Military, repeats Alexander Yakovlev's description of Yazov as a "mediocre officer", "fit to command a division but nothing higher". Odom suggests Gorbachev was only looking for "careerists who would follow orders, any orders".

In March 2019, Yazov was tried in absentia and convicted of war crimes by a Lithuanian court for his role in the military crackdown in Lithuania in January 1991, and sentenced to 10 years in prison. Russia denounced the trial as politically motivated and refused to extradite Yazov.

Death
Yazov died in Moscow on 25 February 2020 following what the Defence Ministry of Russia called "a serious and prolonged illness". He is buried at the Federal Military Memorial Cemetery outside Moscow.

Awards and honors

Soviet Union
Order of Lenin, twice
Order of the October Revolution
Order of the Red Banner
Order of the Patriotic War, 1st class
Order of the Red Star
Order for Service to the Homeland in the Armed Forces of the USSR, 3rd class
Medal "For Military Merit"
Medal "For Impeccable Service", 1st and 2nd classes
Medal "For Distinction in Guarding the State Border of the USSR"
Medal "Veteran of the Armed Forces of the USSR"
Medal "For Strengthening Military Cooperation"
Medal "For Development of the Virgin Lands"
Medal "For the Defence of Leningrad"
Jubilee medals

Russian Federation
Order of Merit for the Fatherland, 3rd and 4th class
Order of Honour
 Order of Alexander Nevsky
 Jubilee medals

Foreign
Order of Red Banner (Afghanistan)
Order of "Friendship of Peoples" (Afghanistan)
Medal "For the strengthening of friendship in Arms" (Bulgaria)
Order of Che Guevara (Cuba)
Order of Red Banner (Czechoslovakia)
Scharnhorst Order (East Germany)
Medal "20 years of independence of the Republic of Kazakhstan"
Medal "30 years of Victory over Japan" (Mongolia)
Medal "40 years of Khalkhin Gol Victory" (Mongolia)
Medal "50 Years of the Mongolian People's Revolution" (Mongolia)
Order of Civil Merit, 1st class (Syria)

Religious
Order of St. Grand Prince Dmitry Donskoy (Russian Orthodox Church)

References

External links

Wilson Center Digital Archive

1924 births
2020 deaths
Central Committee of the Communist Party of the Soviet Union members
Expelled members of the Communist Party of the Soviet Union
Marshals of the Soviet Union
People from Omsk Oblast
Politburo of the Central Committee of the Communist Party of the Soviet Union candidate members
State Committee on the State of Emergency members
People convicted in absentia
Recipients of the Medal "For Distinction in Guarding the State Border of the USSR"
Recipients of the Order of Honour (Russia)
Recipients of the Order of Lenin
Recipients of the Order of the Red Star
Recipients of the Order of the Red Banner
Recipients of the Scharnhorst Order
Soviet Ministers of Defence
Recipients of the Order "For Merit to the Fatherland", 4th class
Recipients of the Order "For Merit to the Fatherland", 3rd class
Burials at the Federal Military Memorial Cemetery
Frunze Military Academy alumni
Military Academy of the General Staff of the Armed Forces of the Soviet Union alumni
Recipients of the Medal of Zhukov
Soviet military personnel of World War II